Baltacha is a family name of Tatar origin, derived from the Turkic word baltacı, meaning "a person skilled with an axe", from balta: "axe", i.e., "woodcutter" or "halberdier".

Notable people with the surname include:

 Sergei Pavlovich Baltacha, the former USSR football player, Dynamo Kyiv
 Sergei Baltacha Jr., son of Sergei Pavlovich Baltacha, football player
 Elena Baltacha, daughter of Sergei Pavlovich Baltacha, tennis player

See also
 Baltacı (disambiguation)

References

Occupational surnames
Turkic-language surnames
Surnames of Tatar origin